Holy Night may refer to:

 "Holy Night" (The West Wing), a 2002 episode of The West Wing
 Holy Night (album), a Christmas album by Kevin Max

See also
 O Holy Night, a Christmas carol
 Holy Night!, a 2009 Spanish computer-animated feature film